Anton Yurevich Alekseev (Антон Юрьевич Алексеев, born 9 August 1967) is a Russian mathematician.

Alekseev was a student of Ludvig Faddeev. Alekseev worked at the Steklov Institute in Saint Petersburg and at the beginning of the 1990s at Uppsala University. He is now a professor ordinarius at the University of Geneva.

Alekseev does research on representation theory of Lie groups and algebras, moment theory, symplectic geometry and mathematical physics.

In 2006 he, with Eckhard Meinrenken, published in Inventiones Mathematicae a proof of the Kashiwara-Vergne conjecture. In 2008 he gave a new proof with Charles Torossian.

2014 Alekseev was an invited speaker with talk Three lives of the Gelfand-Zeitlin integrable system at the International Congress of Mathematicians in Seoul.

Selected publications
as editor with A. Hietamäki, K. Huitu, A. Morozov, Antti Juhani Niemi: Integrable Models and Strings, Proceedings of the 3rd Baltic Rim Student Seminar Held at Helsinki, Finland, 13.–17. September 1993, Springer, Lecture Notes in Physics, 1994; abstract 
within the Proceedings by Anton Alekseev and A. Malkin: Symplectic geometry and the Chern-Simons theory, pp. 59–97 preprint
with Eckhard Meinrenken:  The non commutative Weil Algebra, Inventiones Mathematicae, vol. 139, 2000, pp. 135–172, Arxiv
with Eckhard Meinrenken: Poisson geometry and the Kashiwara-Vergne conjecture, C. R. Acad. Sci., 335, 2003, pp. 723–728, Arxiv
with Eckhard Meinrenken: Clifford algebras and the classical dynamical Yang-Baxter-Equations, Math.Res.Lett., vol. 10, 2003, pp. 253–268, Arxiv
with Eckhard Meinrenken: On the Kashiwara-Vergne conjecture, Inventiones Mathematicae 164, 2006, 615–634,  Arxiv
with Carlo A. Rossi, Charles Torossian, Thomas Willwacher: Logarithms and Deformation Quantization, Inventiones Mathematicae, vol. 206, 2016, pp. 1–26, Arxiv
with C. Torossian: The Kashiwara-Vergne Conjecture and Drinfeld's associators, Annals of Mathematics, vol. 175, 2012, pp. 415–463, Arxiv
with C. Torossian: On triviality of the Kashiwara-Vergne problem for quadratic Lie algebras,  C. R. Math. Acad. Sci. Paris, vol. 347, 2009, pp. 21–22, 1231–1236. Arxiv
with C. Torossian: Kontsevich deformation quantization and  flat connections,  Comm. Math. Phys., vol. 300, 2010, pp. 47–64, Arxiv
with B. Enriquez, C. Torossian: Drinfeld associators, braid groups and explicit solutions of the Kashiwara-Vergne equations, Publ. Math. Inst. Hautes Études Sci., Band 112, 2010, S. 143–189, Arxiv
with Arkady Berenstein, Benjamin Hoffman, Yanpeng Li: Langlands Duality and Poisson-Lie Duality via Cluster Theory and Tropicalization, Arxiv 2018

References

External links
mathnet.ru

1967 births
Living people
20th-century Russian mathematicians
21st-century Russian mathematicians
Saint Petersburg State University alumni
Academic staff of Uppsala University
Academic staff of the University of Geneva